BPM is the call sign of the official short-wave time signal service of the People's Republic of China, operated by the Chinese Academy of Sciences, broadcasting from CAS's National Time Service Center in Pucheng County, Shaanxi at , roughly 70 km northeast of Lintong, along with NTSC's long-wave time signal BPL on 100 kHz.

BPM is broadcast at 2.5, 5.0, 10.0, and 15.0 MHz, the same frequencies as WWV and WWVH, following the schedule listed below:

Transmission format 

BPM transmits different signals on a half-hour schedule, modulated with 1 kHz audio tones to provide second and minute ticks:

BPM is idiosyncratic in that it transmits UT1 time between minutes 25 through to 29 and 55 through to 59, which creates an odd click-beep effect when heard below a stronger time signal station such as WWV especially when UT1 seconds are halfway between UTC seconds, close to a leap-second event.

References

External links 
 National Time Service Center
 短波授时台(Shortwave time signal station), from the National Time Service Center, Chinese Academy of Sciences https://www.sigidwiki.com/wiki/BPM

Time signal radio stations
Radio stations in China
Shortwave radio stations